The England Handball Association is the governing body for non-International Handball Federation related matters of team handball in England while the British Handball Association has governance over matters relating to the International Handball Federation. It is an Associate member of the European Handball Federation (EHF).

Men's competition
England Handball provide both league and cup competitions for clubs.

League
The men's league in England is currently divided into three tiers. The elite tier is the Super 8 in which eight teams from England compete to be the national champion. The second tier is the Championship. This competition is currently divided into North and South. Following an end of season play-off in June, the overall winners are promoted to the Super 8, replacing the team finishing last in the top division. The runners-up in the Championship play a sudden death promotion match against the seventh placed team in the Super 8 for a place in the top division for the following season.

The lowest tier of competition in senior men's handball in England is the third tier which consists of regional development leagues. The number of divisions varies from year to year during the 2014/15 season there were five regional leagues, London, South-West, East, Midlands and North. As of 2016/17 there are four regional leagues, North, Midlands, South-West and South-East. The South-East regional league is divided into three divisions, Tier 1, 2A and 2B, so 2A and 2B make up the fourth tier of English handball.

There is no automatic promotion from the third to the second tier. The third tier is where clubs are able to demonstrate their development and ability to meet the criteria to join the competition at the second tier.

National League (Super 8 since 2012)

England Handball League

Super 8 Premier Handball League

Main Page: Super 8

Second Tier (Championship)
 Data source: 1977-1982 Midlands Handball Association (1982) Handball Directory. page 12;. 2006

Third Tier (Development Leagues)

Cups
The EHA offers two cup competitions for senior males. The EHA National Cup is the cup competition for the top clubs in England. Any club meeting the qualifying criteria may enter. Clubs not eligible for the National Cup may enter the EHA League Cup.

EHA National Cup

Men's National Shield (Previously League Cup)

Women's Competition

Women England Handball National Cup

Women's National Shield (Previously League Cup)

See also
List of handball clubs in England

References

External links
 England Handball
 Handball Blog with many entries related to English Handball
 

European Handball Federation
 
Organisations based in Cheshire
Sport in Warrington
Handball